USS Nomad (SP-1046) was a United States Navy patrol vessel in commission from 1917 to 1918.

Nomad was built as a private motorboat of the same name in 1914 by Goulartte at San Diego, California. In May 1917, the U.S. Navy chartered her from her owner, F. N. Howe of San Diego, for use as a section patrol boat during World War I. She was commissioned on 10 May 1917 as USS Nomad (SP-1046).

Assigned to the 12th Naval District, Nomad patrolled off San Diego in June 1917 and alternated between patrol and guard ship duty there throughout the summer of 1917, rotating with the patrol boat . In September 1917, she assumed the additional duty of boarding vessel to help halt trade in contraband. She assumed special duty with naval aviation on 4 February 1918 and continued outer patrols at San Diego into June 1918.

The Navy returned Nomad to her owner on 9 June 1918.

References

SP-1046 Nomad at Department of the Navy Naval History and Heritage Command Online Library of Selected Images: U.S. Navy Ships -- Listed by Hull Number "SP" #s and "ID" #s -- World War I Era Patrol Vessels and other Acquired Ships and Craft numbered from SP-1000 through SP-1099
NavSource Online: Section Patrol Craft Photo Archive Nomad (SP 1046)

Patrol vessels of the United States Navy
World War I patrol vessels of the United States
Ships built in San Diego
1914 ships